Occupy Harvard was a student demonstration at Harvard University identifying itself with the global Occupy Movement. It sought to create a forum for discussing economic inequality at Harvard, in the United States, and throughout the world. It criticized Harvard's influence on global economic policy and its involvement with the American financial sector. It also supported wage campaigns by Harvard workers and a divestment demand initiated by Hotel Workers Rising.

Facing resistance from administration and police, the group established an encampment in Harvard Yard after a march on November 9, 2011. Immediately after this march, the gates to Harvard Yard were locked and only people with Harvard identity cards were allowed through. Although the encampment gained many faculty supporters, it was not popular among Harvard undergraduates. The security checkpoints were not removed until after the group packed up its tents in December 2011. Occupy Harvard continued to organize into 2012, with a focus on the university's library system.

The demonstration raised issues of privilege and economic inequality, particularly as they relate to students and administration at one of the world's wealthiest and best-known universities. Occupiers inside the library left the same day, as planned. Demonstrations around Harvard's libraries and library workers continued through Commencement 2012.

Reception

Occupy Harvard received praise  and criticism in The Harvard Crimson. The Crimson itself opposed the encampment and published numerous editorials urging the group to move out of Harvard Yard. Contentious issues included the possible hypocrisy of privileged Harvard students, wastefulness of the tents, and, most of all, inconvenience created by the locked gates. The Crimson also cited the possibility of anarchist violence. An editorial published by Harvard graduate Alexandra Petri (class of 2010) in the Washington Post argued that the protestors were motivated not by an authentic desire for justice but instead by need to alleviate their own feelings of elitism and guilt—urging them to "go to class" and learn something while at Harvard.

The demonstrations raised questions for Harvard students about their own role in the nation's economic elite—the so-called "1%". Even participants struggled with the question of how Harvard students could authentically express solidarity with the downtrodden of the world. Students deliberated over the effects of Harvard's comprehensive financial aid policies. Neal Gabler wrote in the New York Times that Harvard students were "superachivers", even considering the effects of financial aid. They were "likely to be wealthy, well-appointed young people groomed and professionalized at an early age precisely so they would impress admissions officers." One Harvard graduate who had already joined Occupy Boston told the Boston Globe that attending Harvard did not ensure membership in the 1%, saying: "I’m the first person in my family to go to college, and I worked hard to go to Harvard, but I feel that the way the country is now, the American dream isn’t possible.’" Some students in a dormitory near the encampment responded directly, chanting "We are the one percent" and yelling insults.

A survey conducted by students in Statistics 104 suggested that student approval of Occupy Harvard averaged 2.85 on a scale of 1–10. A petition titled "Free Harvard", which asked the occupiers to go somewhere else in order to have the Harvard Yard gates reopened, obtained 700 signatures. (Occupiers complained that the University had managed to blame demonstrations for the administration's own  decision to lock the gates.) Other students expressed confusion or curiosity about the purpose of the encampment. 70 faculty members signed letters of support for the demonstration.

The group also provoked response from within. Many said it was a good first step in creating awareness about global economic issues, and creating drama and emotion around political issues (particularly as contrasted with Harvard's Institute of Politics). Others said that it picked up on struggles that already had momentum—for example, HEI divestment, which was already being championed by the Student Labor Action Movement. They stressed the importance but also the difficulty of raising awareness about economic injustice at a school for the wealthy and privileged. Some felt that the process was dominated by graduate students, particularly in its "2.0" phase that focused on the libraries. Some participants were already familiar with consensus decision-making; others were new—to its pitfalls as well as to its advantages. One student criticized Occupy Harvard for being too cautious: "Occupy Harvard is so different from the activism I’ve done in Oakland. In Oakland people don’t hesitate to strike, they don’t hesitate to do radical stuff. Here we need to discuss every nuance before we act. I’ve had to adjust my style and be more patient."

See also

 Privately owned public space
 Educational privilege
 Legacy preferences
 Harvard Corporation

References

External links

Occupy Harvard
 Occupy Harvard website
 Occupy Harvard on Twitter
 "found footage: Occupy Harvard video of a pig discussing revolutionary strategy
 "Season's Greetings from Occupy Harvard" a short video in which "Occu-elves" deliver unpleasant gifts to "naughty" Harvard affiliates (including Larry Summers, Harvey Mansfield, and Niall Ferguson, and Robert Rubin).
 Video of students in Lamont Library arguing (unsuccessfully) with HUPD and unidentified men in suits about signs and the library free speech policy; follow-up video the next day

Videos
 Fox News clip on the Ec 10 walkout (including appearance from Greg Mankiw)
 Video of the march to Harvard Yard on November 9, 2011 (and on YouTube)
 Another video of the 9 November march
 Counter-protestors inside the gate on November 9
 Address to Occupy Harvard by journalist and Harvard Divinity School alumnus Chris Hedges, November 28, 2011
 Index of videos from the group's December 7, 2011 teach-in
 Student video views a demonstration from inside a locked gate then offers a reaction ("I personally cannot wait for Occupy Harvard to be over.")
 Performance by Bread and Puppet Theater in Harvard Yard

Photos
 Occupy Harvard delegation at an Occupy Boston rally on Boston Common, October 10, 2011
 Harvard police at Thayer Gate on November 9, 2011
 Massachusetts Avenue sit-in staged by marchers turned away from the Yard's gates on November 9, 2011
 Sign at the encampment reads "WALL STREET OCCUPIED MY UNIVERSITY" (November 14, 2011)
 Sign at the encampment reads "JUSTICE FOR HARVARD JANITORS" (November 14, 2011)
 Info desk and people at the encampment, November 14, 2011
 Announcements (message board), November 14, 2011
 Locked gates, photographed November 25, 2011
 Harvard Yard encampment photographed through a gate on December 3, 2011
 Photo taken 4 December 2011 of an "Open Letter to Harvard College" posted on the locked gates of Harvard Yard. The letter emphasizes: "We do not blame the occupiers! We blame you!"

News
 "A Different Conversation", editorial in The Crimson published November 9, 2011 encouraging greater civic participation and openness to the Occupy movement
 "Dispatches from Dewey (er, Harvard) Square: Harvard shuts its gates on the 99 percent" — report on November 9 events by Max Chalkin
 Space Occupants, a blog critical of Occupy Harvard

2011 in Massachusetts
Harvard University
Occupy movement
Protests in Massachusetts
Articles containing video clips
History of Cambridge, Massachusetts